Stanisław Ptak (17 April 1902 – September 1939) was a Polish footballer. He played in one match for the Poland national football team in 1927. His club was Cracovia.

He disappeared during the Soviet invasion of Poland in September 1939, and was believed to have been killed by the NKVD when attempting to cross the border.

See also
 List of people who disappeared

References

External links
 

1902 births
1939 deaths
Polish footballers
Poland international footballers
Place of birth missing
Association footballers not categorized by position
Polish military personnel killed in World War II
Missing in action of World War II